Polar Sea  may refer to:

The Arctic Ocean
The Southern Ocean
USCGC Polar Sea (WAGB-11), a United States Coast Guard icebreaker
The Open Polar Sea, a hypothesized ice-free ocean surrounding the North Pole